Muzeum Zamku i Szpitala Wojskowego na Ujazdowie is a museum in Warsaw, Poland which opened in 1994. It is located in the Ujazdów Castle, in one of the rooms belonging to the Centre for the Contemporary Art, in the north-west tower of the castle. The exhibition includes objects and photographs related to the history of the Ujazdów Castle and the Ujazdów military hospital including portraits of the castle owners and a cornerstone from 1624.

References

External links
Internet page of the museum

Castle Ujazdów
Hospital museums
Medical museums in Poland